3-Isopropylmalate dehydratase is an aconitase homologue, which catalyses the isomerisation of 2-isopropylmalate to 3-isopropylmalate, via dehydration, in the biosynthesis of leucine.

References

External links
 

Lyases